Cynthia Leive (born January 21, 1967) is a journalist, media leader and advocate for women. A cultural critic, she is the former editor-in-chief of both Glamour and Self magazines, and the author or producer of numerous books including the 2018 New York Times bestseller "Together We Rise," about the making of the March for Women's Lives. Leive has interviewed heads of state, Hollywood and fashion's biggest personalities, and iconic leaders from all walks of life. She is currently a senior fellow at the USC Annenberg School for Communication and Journalism.

Career 
Leive's career began at The Paris Review, where she was an intern while still a student at Swarthmore College. After graduating, Leive took an editorial assistant position at Glamour and worked alongside Ruth Whitney, who was at the helm of the magazine for 31 years. After 11 years, Leive left Glamour as deputy editor and joined Self magazine as editor-in-chief. During Leive's tenure, Self’s circulation increased by eleven percent.  Leive rejoined Glamour magazine as editor-in-chief in 2001. She was behind creation and success of glamour.com which together with the magazine reach one out of every eight American women, with 9.7 million print readers and 11 million unique users online. Under her stewardship, the magazine launched a monthly digital edition, popular special editions, apps, and books—including two New York Times best-sellers; Lipstick.com, Glamour’s stand-alone beauty site, and Condé Nast's first-ever digital spin-off; a digital video network featuring original programming inspired by Glamour in partnership with Condé Nast Entertainment. Leive also founded The Girl Project to support girls’ education, making Glamour the first women's media brand with a nonprofit initiative.
 

She serves on the board of directors for The International Women’s Media Foundation  and is a former president of the American Society of Magazine Editors. Leive is a board member of Swarthmore College (her alma mater), as well as the Brooklyn Public Library. She is a resident fellow for Yale Publishing Course.

In 2022, Leive served as a judge for that year's American Mosaic Journalism Prize.

Achievements 
In 2002, Crain’s put Leive on its "Top 40 Under 40" list, and Leive was also named one of Gotham magazine's most powerful "Women Under 40 in New York City". 
After 16 years at the helm of Glamour, Leive announced she would be leaving by the end 2017. For her outstanding service to the magazine, publishing industry, and women around the world, she received Glamour's biggest honor - a Woman of the Year Award. Among women who celebrated Leive's accomplishments were former first ladies Hillary Clinton and Michelle Obama, former long-time president of Planned Parenthood Cecile Richards, and Vogues editor-in-chief Anna Wintour.

Personal life 
Leive was born to a Jewish family in McLean, Virginia.  A 1988 graduate of Swarthmore College, Leive was an English literature major and minored in religion.  Leive lives in New York City with her husband, film producer Howard Bernstein, her daughter, Lucy, and her son, Isaac.

References

Living people
1967 births
American magazine editors
Women magazine editors
Jewish American journalists
Swarthmore College alumni
People from McLean, Virginia
Self (magazine) editors
21st-century American Jews
Presidents of the American Society of Magazine Editors